Benney (Bennie) Abrahams  (28 July 1906 – 29 January 1990) was a local Labour Party politician in Newcastle upon Tyne, England, as well as  Lord Mayor of Newcastle.

Born in Durham, Abrahams was a Labour councillor for the Monkchester ward of Newcastle City Council, and in 1981/2 Lord Mayor of Newcastle. He died in January 1990 at the age of 83.

Abrahams married Marion Shapiro, a concert hall violinist for the Liverpool Philharmonic Orchestra in Liverpool in 1939. She also became a Labour councillor in Newcastle. They had one son, David Abrahams,a property developer and political activist.

References

1906 births
1990 deaths
Labour Party (UK) councillors
Councillors in Tyne and Wear
Jewish British politicians
Mayors of Newcastle upon Tyne